Vioño (officially:  Santiago de Ambiedes) is one of thirteen parishes (administrative divisions) in the Gozón municipality, within the province and autonomous community of Asturias, in northern Spain.

The population is 172 (INE 2006).

Villages and hamlets
 Buenavista
 La Cabrera
 La Pedrera
 La Polvorosa
 Vioño

References

Parishes in Gozón